Neapolis is a census-designated place (CDP) in northwestern Providence Township, Lucas County, Ohio, United States. As of the 2020 Census it had a population of 680. It has a post office, with the ZIP code of 43547.

Demographics

History
Neapolis was laid out in 1872. The community was named after Neapolis, in Ancient Greece. A post office called Neapolis has been in operation since 1873.

References

Census-designated places in Lucas County, Ohio
Greek-American culture in Ohio